Mach 4 or variant, may refer to:

 Mach number for four times the speed of sound
 Supersonic speed of 4 times the speed of sound
 MACH-4 (Marvel Comics), a comic book superhero
 Fly Castelluccio Mach 4, a paramotor aircraft
 Kawasaki H2 Mach IV, the "Mach IV" motorcycle
 .17 Mach IV, the .17-calibre Mach IV center-fire rifle bullet
 Mach IV, a personality rating on the rating scale Dark Triad Dirty Dozen

See also

Macha (disambiguation)
Mach (disambiguation)